Racemoramide (INN, BAN), or simply moramide, is an opioid analgesic and a racemic mixture of the substances dextromoramide (the active component) and levomoramide (which is inactive), two enantiomers of a chiral molecule.

Racemoramide is itself controlled; in the United States it is under Schedule I as a Narcotic with an ACSCN of 9645 and a zero annual aggregate manufacturing quota as of 2014. Its salts are the bitartrate (free base conversion ratio 0.723) and dihydrochloride (0.843)

Moramide intermediate is listed separately as a Schedule II Narcotic controlled substance (ACSCN 9802), also with a zero quota.

References 

Analgesics
4-Morpholinyl compunds
Opioids
Propionamides
Pyrrolidines